Gil Dech (3 February 1897 – 1 November 1974) was a New Zealand pianist, recording director and conductor. He was born in Yardley, Worcestershire, England on 3 February 1897.

Discography

Studio Albums
 Remembrance (1956, Columbia)
 The Robin's Return (1956, Columbia)
 Plays Music From Stage And Screen (1956, Columbia)
 Plays Music Of Jerome Kern (1956, Columbia)
 Plays Favourite Ballads (1957, Columbia)
 Gil Dech Plays Piano Miniatures (1968, His Master's Voice)

References

1897 births
1974 deaths
New Zealand conductors (music)
Male conductors (music)
British emigrants to New Zealand
Musicians from Worcester, England
20th-century conductors (music)
20th-century male musicians